James McLaren (born in Lugar) was a Scottish footballer, who played for Hibernian, Celtic, Greenock Morton, Clyde and Scotland. He won three caps for Scotland, scoring one goal and captaining the side once.

See also
List of Scotland national football team captains

References

Celtic F.C. players
Clyde F.C. players
Greenock Morton F.C. players
Hibernian F.C. players
Association football wing halves
Footballers from East Ayrshire
Scotland international footballers
Scottish Football League players
Scottish footballers
Year of death missing
Year of birth missing